Maly Sedyak (Bäläkäy Siźäk) is a rural locality (a selo) in Ziriklinsky Selsoviet, Bizhbulyaksky District, Bashkortostan, Russia. The population was 505 as of 2010. There are 3 streets.

Geography 
Maly Sedyak is located 18 km west of Bizhbulyak (the district's administrative centre) by road. Zirikly is the nearest rural locality.

References 

Rural localities in Bizhbulyaksky District